The Labour Parliament sat for twelve days,  6 to 18 March 1854, as part of a response to the lock out by Preston mill-owners.

The chair was John Clarke Cropper, the general secretary John Teer and the treasurer James Williams.

See also
 Council of Workers' and Soldiers' Delegates (1917)

References

1854 in England